W. Brian White (born July 20, 1967) is an American politician. He is a former member of the South Carolina House of Representatives from the 6th District, serving since 2001. He is a member of the Republican party. White was unseated by Republican challenger April Cromer in the June primary. She then went on to win the South Carolina 6th District seat in the general election.

References

External links 

Living people
1967 births
Republican Party members of the South Carolina House of Representatives
21st-century American politicians